Radial spoke head protein 9 homolog is a protein that in humans is encoded by the RSPH9 gene.

Function 

This gene encodes a protein thought to be a component of the radial spoke head in motile cilia and flagellawhich then releases antibodies .

Clinical significance 

Mutation in this gene are associated with primary ciliary dyskinesia.

References

Further reading

External links
 GeneReviews/NCBI/NIH/UW entry on Primary Ciliary Dyskinesia